The Human Rights Foundation (HRF) is a non-profit organization that focuses on promoting and protecting human rights globally, with an emphasis on closed societies. HRF organizes the Oslo Freedom Forum. The Human Rights Foundation was founded in 2005 by Thor Halvorssen Mendoza, a Venezuelan film producer and human rights advocate. The current chairman is Russian chess grandmaster Garry Kasparov, and Javier El-Hage is the current chief legal officer. The foundation's head office is in the Empire State Building in New York City.

Organization
HRF's website states that it adheres to the definition of human rights as put forth in the International Covenant on Civil and Political Rights (1976), believing that all individuals are entitled to the right to speak freely, the right to worship in the manner of their choice, the right to freely associate with those of like mind, the right to acquire and dispose of property, the right to leave and enter their country, the right to equal treatment and due process under law, the right to be able to participate in the government of their country, freedom from arbitrary detainment or exile, freedom from slavery and torture, and freedom from interference and coercion in matters of conscience.

According to the New York Times, HRF "has helped smuggle activists out of repressive countries, provided many with broader exposure and connected others with prominent financiers and technologists".

The Council is currently chaired by chess Grandmaster Garry Kasparov.

Oslo Freedom Forum
The Oslo Freedom Forum is an annual HRF conference in Oslo, Norway, supported by several grant-giving institutions in Scandinavia and the United States through HRF. Donors include Fritt Ord, the City of Oslo, the Thiel Foundation, the Norwegian Helsinki Committee, the Royal Norwegian Ministry of Foreign Affairs, Amnesty International Norway, Plan Norway, the Brin Wojcicki Foundation, Human Rights House Foundation, and Ny Tid. The forum is funded in part by the municipality of Oslo, the Norwegian Ministry of affairs, and the Fritt ord Foundation.

In different counties

Belarus 
During the 2020–2021 Belarusian protests, the Office of the United Nations High Commissioner for Human Rights documented more than 450 cases of torture and ill-treatment of detainees, as well as reports of sexual abuse and rape. At the end of 2020, the Viasna Human Rights Centre documented 1,000 testimonies of torture victims. HRF sent letters to fifteen officers of law enforcement agencies of Belarus and officials of the government of the country, in which it called on them to voluntarily resign and warned them of responsibility for the crimes against humanity.

China
In 2011, HRF announced its membership in the International Committee to Support Liu Xiaobo. The committee consists of a "coalition composed of six Nobel Peace Prize winners and 15 non-governmental organizations," formed to defend, and advocate for the release of the 2010 Nobel Peace Prize Laureate Liu Xiaobo and his wife Liu Xia, both detained in China.

Cuba
In September 2012, HRF founder Thor Halvorssen wrote an open letter to Ted Marlow, CEO of Urban Outfitters, urging him to reconsider Urban Outfitters' sale of Che Guevara emblazoned merchandise "for the sake of the thousands who perished in the Cuban revolution, and for the sake of the 11 million Cubans who still endure a totalitarian system". It was reported that in October 2012 Urban Outfitters removed the merchandise in response to the outrage.

In May 2013, HRF awarded the Václav Havel Prize for Creative Dissent to The Ladies in White (Las Damas de Blanco). In 2015, the award was given to Danilo Maldonado, El Sexto, a Cuban graffiti artist and activist who was arrested in December 2014 for trying to stage a performance art piece in the center of Havana.

In July 2014, HRF submitted a petition to the UN Special Rapporteur requesting an appeal to the government of Cuba on the assault of Roberto de Jesus Guerra Perez, a Cuban journalist and founder of Centro de Informacion Hablemos Press.

Dominican Republic
The Sugar Babies: The Plight of the Children of Agricultural Workers in the Sugar Industry (2007) is a feature-length documentary film about exploitation in the sugar plantations of the Dominican Republic. The film, narrated by Edwidge Danticat, suggests that the descendants of African slaves, brought over from Haiti, live and work in unfair conditions akin to "modern day slavery". HRF produced and provided the funding for the documentary film The Sugar Babies. It was first screened at Florida International University on June 27, 2007. The documentary about human trafficking of Haitians in the Dominican Republic drew protest from the Fanjul brothers, one of the largest beneficiaries of the human trafficking depicted in the film.

Ecuador
In March 2008 HRF wrote to Ecuadorian President Rafael Correa asking for the release of the imprisoned governor of the province of Orellana, Guadalupe Llori, implying that the charges against her were politically motivated. Later in March Amnesty International declared that governor Llori may be a prisoner of conscience and a political prisoner According to HRF Llori was imprisoned on trumped up terrorism charges by the government. She was sent to El Inca prison where she remained for about ten months. HRF filed a communication with the UN Working Group on Arbitrary Detention, pleading that it activate its urgent action procedure and send an appeal to the government of Ecuador for the immediate release of political prisoner Guadalupe Llori. HRF visited her in prison. She was eventually freed after an intense international campaign and credited HRF with her release.

Equatorial Guinea
In August 2012, HRF called for former US President Bill Clinton, who according to tax documents is the "honorary chairman" of the Leon H Sullivan Foundation, to revoke the foundation's decision to allow Teodoro Obiang to host their Sullivan Summit. Of Clinton, Halvorssen said "Mr Clinton's wife is US Secretary of State...It seems perplexing that he would allow himself to be so closely associated with a vile dictator."

Haiti
Following the 2010 earthquake that took place in Haiti, HRF began a fundraising campaign for a food program devoted to the children of the St Clare's community of Port-au-Prince. The program was started in 2000 by American author Margaret Trost and by Gérard Jean-Juste, a former Amnesty International prisoner of conscience who served as the priest of the St. Clare's community. The campaign aimed at providing 160,000 meals for children.

North Korea

In 2015, the Human Rights Foundation has helped to organize and bankroll a balloon drop of 10,000 copies of an edited version of the movie The Interview over North Korea. Previously, the HRF "has financed balloon drops of pamphlets, TV shows, books and movies over a course of several years, though nothing as high-profile and crudely belittling to Kim Jong Un as is The Interview."

According to Wired, HRF's North Korea program is "an initiative that unites activists in Korea with technologists and campaigners in the West."
In 2014, HRF hosted the world's first hackathon for North Korea at Code for America's offices in San Francisco. According to the Wall Street Journal, "about 100 hackers, coders and engineers gathered in San Francisco to brainstorm ways to pierce the information divide that separates North Korea from the rest of the world."

In 2016, the HRF smuggled USB flash drives with films and television shows to expose North Koreans to popular culture from overseas. The flash drives were called "flash drives for freedom".

Swaziland
In 2014 HRF invited Swazi human rights lawyer Thulani Maseko to speak at the Oslo Freedom Forum. He was later jailed for defaming the King's justice system.

After a sustained media international campaign, Maseko was eventually freed.

Conferences and events

Hack North Korea
In 2014, HRF hosted Hack North Korea, a gathering of Bay Area technologists, investors, engineers, designers, activists and North Korean defectors that aimed to spark new ideas for getting information into North Korea.

College Freedom Forum
The College Freedom Forum (CFF) is a series of one-day events designed to educate and enlighten students about individual rights and democracy around the world. Each CFF features presentations and an opportunity for students and audience members to interact with the speakers one-on-one and during a question and answer session.

U.N. Human Rights Council Member Elections
In November 2012 and 2013, HRF co-hosted an event at the United Nations headquarters in New York with the Geneva-based organization UN Watch. The events focused on raising awareness of the election of competitive authoritarian and fully authoritarian regimes to the UN Human Rights Council. HRF brought human rights activists from different countries to testify about the abuses committed by their respective governments.

Oslo Freedom Forum
In May 2009, with support from the city of Oslo and the John Templeton Foundation, HRF organized the Oslo Freedom Forum. During the conference, democracy and human rights activist toell their stories and express their views about human rights in the world. The forum holds an annual event in Oslo, along with satellite events organized across the world.

San Francisco Freedom Forum
In October 2012 the Human Rights Foundation hosted the first San Francisco Freedom Forum, which was described as "a unique convergence of-pro freedom voices." The event was supported by Peter Thiel's charitable foundation, Sergey Brin's foundation, and Anne Wojcicki. Nobel Peace Prize laureate Aung San Suu Kyi, on her first trip to the United States since 1971, was presented with a Václav Havel Prize for Creative Dissent. Suu Kyi discussed the motives behind human rights violations and said that they cannot be addressed unless "we know what can be done to prevent" people from dehumanizing one another. The Forum brought attention to a number of human rights issues, and other attendees included Manal al-Sharif, a Saudi woman who challenged her country's ban on women driving by coordinating a "Women2Drive" protest via YouTube, and the spokesman of jailed Russian punk band Pussy Riot.

Sime MIA
In November 2014, the Oslo Freedom Forum curated a session at the Sime MIA conference in Miami. The conference featured HRF president Thor Halvorssen, Jordanian cartoonist Suleiman Bakhit, and North Korean refugee Yeonmi Park.

Center for Law and Democracy

Honduran Democracy Crisis
Following the 2009 Honduran coup d'état that deposed President Manuel Zelaya, HRF requested all member states of the Organization of American States to adhere to the Inter-American Democratic Charter. HRF also advocated for the suspension of the government that ousted President Zelaya. HRF chairman Armando Valladares resigned on July 2, 2009, in response to the HRF position on the Honduran coup. The new chairman of the organization was poet and former Czech president Václav Havel.

In November 2009, HRF published a report called "The facts and the law behind the democratic crisis in Honduras 2009", in which it concluded that the Organization of American States had acted correctly in activating the Inter-American Democratic Charter, and incorrectly in its diplomatic actions to revert the military coup. The report also concludes that the OAS behaved as an agent of Zelaya prior to the coup d'état and that Zelaya had been eroding Honduran democracy.

Public perception 
After the HRF criticized the Bolivian government and specifically government minister Sacha Sergio Llorenti Soliz for alleged human rights violations in a public letter, the minister referred to HRF as "right wing". In the same month, eighteen Latin America scholars signed an opinion piece in the Norwegian newspaper Aftenposten criticizing the Oslo Freedom Forum for focusing criticism only on Venezuela, Bolivia and Ecuador, three countries with leftist governments. The scholars praised the group for putting "the spotlight on key global issues", but also stated that Cuban human rights activist Armando Valladares had defended the 2009 Honduran coup d'état while speaking at the forum.

References

External links
 

Human rights organizations based in the United States
International human rights organizations
Organizations established in 2005
Human rights in Latin America
Non-profit organizations based in New York City